Hannah Monson (born 21 April 1992) is an Australian actress best known for her role as Kirstie Darrow in the ABC drama Glitch.

Filmography

Film

Television

References

External links
 
 

Living people
1992 births
Australian film actresses
Australian television actresses
21st-century Australian actresses
People from Mildura